Cardiff Central is a constituency of the Senedd. It elects one Member of the Senedd by the first past the post method of election. Also, however, it is one of eight constituencies in the South Wales Central electoral region, which elects four additional members, in addition to eight constituency members, to produce a degree of proportional representation for the region as a whole.

History

From 1999, Cardiff Central was a safe seat for the Liberal Democrats. However the seat was lost to Labour in 2011 with a huge 14.7% swing. In 2016 this was the Liberal Democrats target seat with their candidate Eluned Parrott a current regional AM for South Wales Central. The result actually saw a very slight increase in Labour's majority in a very disappointing night for the Liberal Democrats.  The seat remains one of the most marginal in the assembly.

Furthermore, in 2016 two former Big Brother participants were the candidates for Plaid Cymru and the Conservatives.

Boundaries

The constituency was created for the first election to the Assembly, in 1999, with the name and boundaries of the Cardiff Central Westminster constituency. It is entirely within the preserved county of South Glamorgan.

The other seven constituencies of the region are Cardiff North, Cardiff South and Penarth, Cardiff West, Cynon Valley, Pontypridd, Rhondda and Vale of Glamorgan.

Voting
In general elections for the Senedd, each voter has two votes. The first vote may be used to vote for a candidate to become the Member of the Senedd for the voter's constituency, elected by the first past the post system. The second vote may be used to vote for a regional closed party list of candidates. Additional member seats are allocated from the lists by the d'Hondt method, with constituency results being taken into account in the allocation.

Assembly members and Members of the Senedd

Elections

Elections in the 2020s

Elections in the 2010s

Regional ballots rejected at the count: 208

Elections in the 2000s

2003 Electorate: 62,470
Regional ballots rejected: 285

Elections in the 1990s

1999 Electorate: 57,700

References

Senedd constituencies in the South Wales Central electoral region
Politics of Cardiff
1999 establishments in Wales
Constituencies established in 1999